Kell am See is a former Verbandsgemeinde ("collective municipality") in the district Trier-Saarburg, in Rhineland-Palatinate, Germany. The seat of the Verbandsgemeinde was in Kell am See. In January 2019 it was merged into the new Verbandsgemeinde Saarburg-Kell.

The Verbandsgemeinde Kell am See consisted of the following Ortsgemeinden ("local municipalities"):

Baldringen 
Greimerath 
Heddert 
Hentern 
Kell am See
Lampaden 
Mandern 
Paschel 
Schillingen 
Schömerich 
Vierherrenborn 
Waldweiler 
Zerf

Former Verbandsgemeinden in Rhineland-Palatinate